The House of Riste and Nikola Vankovski, also surnamed Pangovski, is a historical house in Galičnik that is listed as Cultural heritage of North Macedonia. It is in ownership of one branch of the family of Pangovski/Vankovski.

Family history
The Pangovski/Vankovski has its roots from the Duruzovci/Duruzovski family. There are two theories of the background of the Doruzovci: the first one is that they originated from the city of Durres (modern day Albania) and the second being that Ilija's (one of the progenitors) grand father got the nickname Duruz that has a Turkish origin.

Members of the family 
 Iljo Pangovski - member of the Communist Party of Yugoslavia
 Krste Pangovski - member of the League of Communist Youth of Yugoslavia and Communist Party of Yugoslavia
 Blaže Pangovski - member of the League of Communist Youth of Yugoslavia and Communist Party of Yugoslavia
 Velimir Vankovski - member of the League of Communist Youth of Yugoslavia and Communist Party of Yugoslavia
 Vele Vankovski - member of the Communist Party of Yugoslavia
 Nikola Vankovski - member of the Communist Party of Yugoslavia
 Lambe Vankovski - member of the Communist Party of Yugoslavia

References

External links
 National Register of objects that are cultural heritage (List updated to December 31, 2012) (In Macedonian)
 Office for Protection of Cultural Heritage (In Macedonian)

Galičnik
Cultural heritage of North Macedonia
Historic houses